In enzymology, a cholesterol 7alpha-monooxygenase is an enzyme that catalyzes the chemical reaction

cholesterol + NADPH + H+ + O2  7alpha-hydroxycholesterol + NADP+ + H2O

The 4 substrates of this enzyme are cholesterol, NADPH, H+, and O2, whereas its 3 products are 7-alpha-hydroxycholesterol, NADP+, and H2O.

This enzyme belongs to the family of oxidoreductases, specifically those acting on paired donors, with O2 as oxidant and incorporation or reduction of oxygen. The oxygen incorporated need not be derived from O2 with NADH or NADPH as one donor, and incorporation of one atom o oxygen into the other donor.  The systematic name of this enzyme class is cholesterol,NADPH:oxygen oxidoreductase (7alpha-hydroxylating). Other names in common use include cholesterol 7alpha-hydroxylase, and CYP7A1.  This enzyme participates in bile acid biosynthesis and ppar signaling pathway.  It employs one cofactor, heme.

References

 
 
 

EC 1.14.13
NADPH-dependent enzymes
Heme enzymes
Enzymes of unknown structure